The following is a list of characters that first appeared in the Australian soap opera Neighbours in 1985, by order of first appearance. They were all introduced by the show's creator and executive producer Reg Watson. The 1st season of Neighbours began airing on 18 March 1985. The first episode introduced the members of the Ramsay and Robinson families as well as bachelor Des Clarke, and his soon-to-be wife and former stripper Daphne Lawrence. Max Ramsay, his wife Maria and their sons, Shane and Danny lived at Number 24. Jim Robinson lived next door with his children; Paul, Julie, Scott and Lucy. They were joined by Jim's mother in law, Helen Daniels. Myra De Groot joined the cast as Des's mother, Eileen and Maxine Klibingaitis arrived as plumber's assistant, Terry Inglis. Philip Martin began appearing from June and his children, Debbie and Michael, arrived in July and October respectively. Con man Douglas Blake played by Anne Haddy's real-life husband James Condon made his first appearance in September.

Max Ramsay

Max Ramsay, played by Francis Bell, made his first on-screen appearance on 18 March 1985. Max is the patriarch of the Ramsay family and Ramsay Street is named after his grandfather. Max lived at No.24 with his wife, Maria (Dasha Bláhová) and their sons, Shane (Peter O'Brien) and Danny (David Clencie). Bell based the character of Max on a person who helped raise him in New Zealand. He said "Max is based on a man whom I loved, but who gave me a very hard time".

Danny Ramsay

Danny Ramsay, played by David Clencie, made his first on-screen appearance on 18 March 1985. Danny was the first character to speak in Neighbours. He is the youngest son of Maria Ramsay (Dagmar Bláhová) and brother to Shane Ramsay (Peter O'Brien). Jason Donovan was initially offered the role of Danny before it was given to Clencie. Danny was described as the "gentler" of the two brothers.

Maria Ramsay

Maria Ramsay, played by Dasha Bláhová, made her first appearance during the show's first episode broadcast on 18 March 1985. She was the first regular character to leave the serial, after six months on screen. Maria is married to Max Ramsay (Francis Bell) and is the mother of Shane Ramsay (Peter O'Brien) and Danny Ramsay (David Clencie). Maria is billed as "a warm and sensitive woman, tolerant of her husband's moods." Her best friend is Helen Daniels (Anne Haddy), who helped Maria and Max reconcile after a period of separation, and is the only other person aware that Max is not Danny's biological father. Television critic, Andrew Mercado called the Ramsay family the backbone of the serial during the early years. In her book "Soap opera", Dorothy Hobson describes Maria and her family as "more working class than other characters". She also said "They had working-class jobs but were not represented as cloth cap wearing or dowdy, they were bright and modern and representative of a vibrant and working population." To celebrate the 20th anniversary of Neighbours, the BBC asked readers to nominate their twenty favourite obscure characters. Maria came in fourteenth place in list. In her review of the serial, Jacqueline Lee Lewis of The Sydney Morning Herald felt Bláhová "gives a particularly sensitive performance" as Maria.

Maria is the daughter of an Italian father, Franco and a Czech mother, Anna. She is married to Max Ramsay, whom she met when he worked with her father in Queensland. They live at Number 24 Ramsay Street with their sons Shane and Danny. Maria's marriage to Max is rocky as their personalities are different. She notices that Max does not have the same interest in Danny as he does with Shane, and she suspects that Max knows he is not Danny's real father. Maria interviews Terry Inglis (Maxine Klibingaitis) to be Max's assistant and Terry tells her that she is keen to prove that she can do the job as well as any man. Maria supports her and gives Terry the job.

When Danny turns eighteen, Maria tells Max that when she found him with another woman on their wedding anniversary, she ran away to a country inn, where she met Tim Duncan (Nick Carrafa). They had a one-night stand and she later found out she was pregnant with Danny. Only her friend Helen Daniels knew the truth. Max becomes enraged and moves into a bedsit. While the couple were separated, Maria falls in love with Richard Morrison (Peter Flett). Danny does not accept the relationship and forces Maria to choose between him and Richard. She makes the difficult choice to be with Richard and she leaves Erinsborough to live in Hong Kong with him. After a few months, Maria returns to her mother's home and she calls Max. Max agrees to give their marriage a second chance and he moves to Brisbane to be with her. Nearly 40 years later, Shane returns to Erinsborough to buy into Lassiter's Hotel. When 24 Ramsay Street is put up for sale, he calls Maria and promises to buy it for her.

Julie Robinson

Julie Robinson, played by Vikki Blanche, made her first screen appearance during the episode broadcast on 18 March 1985. Julie is the daughter of Anne and Jim Robinson (Alan Dale), however Jim is not Julie's biological father. His boss Roger Bannon had raped Anne and Julie was the product. Jim agreed to bring Julie up as his own. Julie is described as being unable to keep her nose out of other people's business and having a "pompous manner." Of Julie, The Independent said "Julie Martin, is such an accomplished blamer that she would be beaten up daily if she were a schoolgirl."

Paul Robinson

Paul Robinson, played by Stefan Dennis, made his first screen appearance during the episode broadcast on 18 March 1985. Dennis' agent got him the audition with Neighbours and he was initially not keen. He auditioned for the roles of Shane Ramsay and Des Clarke before being cast as Paul. Paul was shown to be the quieter member of his family and he previously worked as an air steward.

Scott Robinson

Scott Robinson, played by Darius Perkins, made his first screen appearance during the episode broadcast on 18 March 1985. Scott is the youngest son of Anne and Jim Robinson (Alan Dale). He becomes best friends with Danny Ramsay (David Clencie) and dates Kim Taylor (Jenny Young).

Helen Daniels

Helen Daniels, played by Anne Haddy, made her first screen appearance during the episode broadcast on 18 March 1985. Haddy was invited by Watson to play Helen, a mother-in-law who was not a stereotypical battleaxe. Helen is the matriarch of the Robinson family household. She married her childhood sweetheart Bill and they had a daughter, Anne. Helen and Bill later adopted Rosemary (Joy Chambers). Helen is described as being "a shoulder to cry on for her friends and family". She is sympathetic, caring and motherly.

Shane Ramsay

Shane Ramsay, played by Peter O'Brien, made his first screen appearance during the episode broadcast on 18 March 1985. Shane is the elder son of Max (Francis Bell) and Maria Ramsay (Dasha Bláhová). O'Brien auditioned for the role of Shane twice in 1984 and following the cancellation of medical series Starting Out, he was cast as the older Ramsay brother. Shane was described by Network Ten as a "very together guy, despite being deprived of a normal childhood because of his father's obsession with his diving training".

Des Clarke

Des Clarke, played by Paul Keane, made his first screen appearance during the episode broadcast on 18 March 1985. Des, a bank manager, is engaged to Lorraine Kingham (Antoinette Byron), until she calls off the wedding. He then allows Daphne Lawrence (Elaine Smith) to move in. Stefan Dennis originally auditioned for the role of Des.

Daphne Lawrence

Daphne Lawrence, played by Elaine Smith, made her first screen appearance during the episode broadcast on 18 March 1985. Daphne is introduced as a stripper hired for Des Clarke's (Paul Keane) bucks party. Smith originally auditioned for a guest role, but her appearance, particularly her spiky hairstyle, caught the attention of the casting director and he cast her in the role of Daphne.

Jim Robinson

Jim Robinson, played by Alan Dale, is the patriarch of the Robinson family. He made his first screen appearance during the episode broadcast on 18 March 1985. The role of Jim was originally given to Robin Harrison, but when contract negotiations broke down between him and Neighbours, the role was given to Dale. Jim is described as a man having it all: wealth, children and having a way with women. Jim changed after his wife's death and was often seen as having a reserved sadness within him, he has also been perceived as "stuffy and proper".

Lucy Robinson

Lucy Robinson, played by Kylie Flinker, is the youngest of Jim Robinson's (Alan Dale) children. She made her first screen appearance during the episode broadcast on 18 March 1985. Lucy was created as a young child to help the show appeal to all ages. Lucy is described as being an innocent child who never does anything wrong.

Kim Taylor

Kim Taylor (also Tanaka), played by Jenny Young, made her first appearance on 20 March 1985. The character and her parents were one of the serial's guest families, who departed when their storyline played out. Kim was billed as "a nice, bright girl, but lonely at school because her mother is an unpopular teacher." Kim dates her friend Scott Robinson (Darius Perkins) and tries to keep it a secret from her parents. Young reprised her role over thirty-two years later, and Kim returned on 30 March 2017, to visit her sons David (Takaya Honda) and Leo Tanaka (Tim Kano) in Erinsborough.

While Kim is in a relationship with Scott Robinson, she keeps it a secret from her mother, Marcia Taylor (Maureen Edwards), knowing she will not approve. Danny Ramsay (David Clencie) and his friend Eddie Sherwin (Darren Boyd) reveal the relationship when they play a practical joke. They record a conversation between Kim and Scott and edit it to make it sound sexual. Marcia, who teaches at Erinsborough High, forces the boys to play the tape in class, embarrassing Kim and Scott. The couple run away together and they hide out in an old monastery. Kim's mother makes a televised appeal for her safe return.

Scott's father Jim Robinson (Alan Dale) finds them at the old monastery, and Scott agrees to return home. However, Kim runs away upon hearing their conversation. She later calls her mother to let her know that she will not be back. Kim goes into the city and finds a bedsit to share with a girl called Sonia (Cindy Lee). Scott visits a few times to lend her money and his brother, Paul Robinson (Stefan Dennis) and Father Barry (Wayne Cull), also visit and try to change her mind. However, Kim refuses to return home. Weeks later, Kim gets in touch with Scott asking if he can lend her some more money and he borrows it from Paul. Scott realises that there is something wrong with Kim and she admits that she is hiding from a man named Brad (Rick Ireland), who is allegedly the father of the child she is expecting. Brad follows Scott to Kim's halfway house and he tells her that he wants her and their baby back.

Kim's pregnant friend, Josie (Cindy Lee), reveals that Brad is arranging for them both to sell their babies. Scott disapproves, and when Brad starts threatening her, Kim reconsiders the plan. She decides against it altogether when she sees how unhappy Josie is after giving her child away. Scott speaks to Paul, who arranges them to visit a family planning clinic. At the clinic, Kim breaks down and is unsure whether to go through with an abortion. Helen Daniels (Anne Haddy) offers to assist Kim by tracking down her parents, who have moved away. Marcia initially refuses to acknowledge Kim, but she eventually goes to see her. Marcia explains to Kim that she had been in a similar situation twenty-seven years ago. She was forced to give away her daughter, Karen. Kim tells her mother that she needs her support and they go home.

Kim returns to Erinsborough thirty two years later to visit her sons David and Leo Tanaka, who want to know who their father is. Disproving her sons' suspicions, Kim confirms that Hiroshi Udagawa is not their father, but refuses to talk about the subject any further. She then asks Paul's daughter, Amy Williams (Zoe Cramond), to stay away from David and Leo. Kim meets with Paul and she tells him that he is David and Leo's father; they then learn that Amy and Leo are on a holiday together, and Kim and Paul race to stop them having sex. They make it just in time, and Kim and Paul reveal the truth. David is angry with Kim for keeping their father's identity a secret. Paul apologises to Kim, who tells him to be the father her boys deserve.

Eileen Clarke

Eileen Clarke, played by Myra De Groot, made her first appearance during the episode broadcast on 15 April 1985. De Groot was only supposed to be in Neighbours for a week, but she thought Eileen was too interesting to be allowed to leave and wrote an expanded character and took it to the producers. They signed her up for a permanent position. One of Eileen's prominent stories was the reintroduction of her estranged husband Malcolm Clarke (Noel Trevarthen). Eileen shares a son with Malcolm, Des (Paul Keane). In their backstory, it details that Malcolm left Eileen and had another child Sally Wells (Rowena Mohr) and again abandoned his family. Writers explored this by introducing Sally into the series in search of her father which concluded with his arrival in Erinsborough. Eileen reunites with Malcolm and agrees to marry him. Patrice Fidgeon from TV Week reported that their wedding would not happen because of Eileen's "overbearing" ways. On-screen Eileen is so fixated on conducting the wedding her way that Malcolm changes his mind. The story ended with Eileen alone on her wedding day as Malcolm decides to flee once again.

A writer from The Soap Show called Eileen an "interfering mother." While an Inside Soap journalist called her "overbearing" and "the mother from hell". They believed she was the reason why Des struggled to cope with things by himself. Eileen was named as one of the BBC's twenty favourite obscure Neighbours characters. Viewers said "Des Clarke's mother Eileen, played by Myra de Groot. I remember the episode when they went to church and she sung so loudly and out of tune that the rest of the congregation stopped singing, but she ploughed on regardless. It was hysterical".

When her husband, Malcolm, walks out on her, Eileen is left to raise their son Des alone. Des leaves home after becoming tired of Eileen's interfering ways. Eileen later follows Des to Erinsborough to check up on him and she takes an instant dislike to Des' housemate, Daphne Lawrence (Elaine Smith). Eileen feigns illness in the hope of extending her stay, but Des sees through her and gets her checked over by a doctor, who tells Eileen that she is fine. Eileen decides to move permanently to Erinsborough anyway, and Des finds his mother a home near Ramsay Street. Eileen realises that Des and Daphne are in love and she come to accept Daphne. Des proposes to Daphne and Eileen misses the wedding because she is on a cruise. Eileen stays with Des and Daphne after her home is burgled. Des takes Daphne on honeymoon and leaves Eileen to look after his house and care for their teenage charge, Mike Young (Guy Pearce). Eileen becomes involved in the community and helps Daphne out at her new Coffee Shop. She also joins the Erinsborough Musical Society.

Nell Mangel (Vivean Gray) reads Eileen's tea leaves for her and reveals that a younger man is soon going to enter her life. Eileen begins dressing younger to attract a young man and becomes convinced that Harold Bishop (Ian Smith) is her admirer. Eileen tries to make Harold notice her and he later accepts an offer of dinner. Nell becomes jealous and tells Eileen that Harold is a womaniser, Eileen then ends her pursuit of him. Daphne gives birth to Jamie (SJ Dey) and Eileen dotes on her grandson. Malcolm arrives in Ramsay Street after his daughter, Sally, comes to meet Des. Both Eileen and Des are reluctant to see him, but Malcolm romances Eileen and they decide to get married again. However, Malcolm leaves Eileen on the day of the wedding. Eileen grows close to Sally after his departure, but she also develops an addiction to tranquillisers. She later overcomes this with the help of her family and friends. Daphne dies after a car accident and Eileen suffers a nervous breakdown and is put into a rest home. Des later decides that she should stay with him, but Malcolm gives her and Sally tickets for a trip. Eileen accepts the tickets and she and Sally leave town. They eventually settle in England and Eileen falls in love and marries.

Terry Inglis

Terry Inglis, played by Maxine Klibingaitis, made her first screen appearance during the episode broadcast on 11 June 1985. Terry is employed by Max Ramsay (Francis Bell) as a plumber's assistant. She begins a relationship with Paul Robinson (Stefan Dennis), which The Sydney Morning Herald said was a "whirlwind romance."

Philip Martin

Philip Martin, played by Christopher Milne, made his first screen appearance during the episode broadcast on 21 June 1985. Philip is the husband of Loretta (Lyn Semler) and father to Debbie (Mandy Storvik) and Michael (Sam Hammington). He is the manager of the Pacific Bank.

Debbie Martin

Debbie Martin, played by Mandy Storvik, made her first screen appearance during the episode broadcast on 27 July 1985. Debbie is the only daughter of Philip (Christopher Milne) and Loretta Martin (Lyn Semler).

Douglas Blake

Douglas Blake, played by James Condon, made his first screen appearance during the episode broadcast on 17 September 1985. Douglas is a Con man who targets Helen Daniels, played by Condon's real life wife, Anne Haddy.

When Helen Daniels (Anne Haddy) displays her art work, she attracts the attentions of Douglas. He tells her that her work is great and that he can help her to make a name for herself with an exhibition. Jim Robinson (Alan Dale) is suspicious of Douglas and he finds out from Max Ramsay (Francis Bell) that Douglas has a wife. Jim warns Douglas off of Helen, but Douglas explains that the woman is actually his sister, Amanda (Linda McConchie). Douglas plans the exhibition and tells Helen not to pay any money towards it. Helen calls the gallery shortly before the exhibition takes place and is told that Douglas had pulled out. Helen confronts Douglas and he tells her that did not feel that the gallery owners were keen on her work. Helen and Douglas begin to grow closer and Douglas takes Helen to a guesthouse for the weekend. Helen admits that things are moving too quickly for her, but she realises that it might be her last chance for happiness and they start making wedding plans. Douglas says that he is going to buy a cottage for them both, but just before the wedding Douglas tells Helen that the sale on his house had fallen through and he could not purchase the cottage. Jim suggests that he lends the money to Douglas until his house is sold, Helen is unsure, but Douglas talk her round. Jim gives the money to Douglas, but days after the documents are apparently drawn up, Douglas disappears. Jim breaks the news to Helen, who is furious that Douglas had broken her heart and left the family with financial problems.

Helen hires a private investigator to track down Douglas and he discovers that Douglas is at a hotel in the city. Helen gets Madge Mitchell (Anne Charleston) to help her in a plot that would see Jim get his money back. Madge poses as a rich, single woman who checks into the hotel where Douglas is staying. She makes sure that he overhears her complaining about standards and he approaches her. He tells her that his name is Douglas Manning and Madge explains that she is having trouble paying her bill. She explains that she has some diamonds and Douglas tells her that he would be happy to value them for her. Douglas asks why she does not sell the diamonds to pay the bill, but Madge tells him that she took them from her ex-husband. Douglas convinces her to give him a diamond, so he can have it valued. Madge gives him a real diamond from her wedding ring and Douglas tells her that it is worth less than it actually is. Douglas presses her to sell it and the other diamonds. He later tells her that he has found a buyer for the diamonds, which delights Madge. They arrange to meet and exchange the money and the diamonds. Helen decides to apply some extra pressure and her private investigator approaches Douglas in the lobby and explains that he is working for Helen. Douglas panics and he makes the exchange with Madge, who gives him fake diamonds. As he leaves, he sees Helen and pretends to be happy to see her. She reveals that she and Madge set him up and that he had just paid $50,000 for fake diamonds, before walking away.

Michael Martin

Michael Martin, played by Samuel Hammington, is the only son of Philip (Christopher Milne) and Loretta Martin (Lyn Semler). He made his first screen appearance during the episode broadcast on 8 October 1985. A writer from Ausculture described him as a "troubled teen."

Others

References

Bibliography

External links
 Characters and cast at the Official AU Neighbours website
 Characters and cast at the Official UK Neighbours website
 Characters and cast at the Internet Movie Database

1985
, Neighbours